Sell Your Haunted House is a 2021 South Korean television series directed by Park Jin-seok for Korean Broadcasting System. Starring Jang Na-ra, Jung Yong-hwa, Kang Hong-seok, and Ahn Gil-kang, the series follows an exorcist real estate agent. She performs exorcism on real estates where ghosts appear, and joins hands with a con-artist to unearth a secret. It premiered on KBS2 on April 14, 2021 and aired on Wednesday and Thursdays at 21:30 (KST).

Synopsis
Hong Ji-ah (Jang Na-ra) is a real estate broker and an exorcist. She owns Daebak Real Estate which offers the service to clean out buildings in which ghosts frequent and people have died in. She inherited the ability to exorcise from her deceased mother.

Oh In-beom (Jung Yong-hwa) is a con-artist who uses ghosts to earn money. He has a tragic past where his uncle died with no exact explanation why.

Hong Ji-ah and Oh In-beom team up to solve the secret behind her mother and his uncle's deaths 20 years ago.

Cast

Main
 Jang Na-ra as Hong Ji-ah, an exorcist and owner of Daebak Real Estate Her mother died 20 year ago during an exorcism. She wants to send her mother's spirit but cannot find the right psychic to possess her since she was an exorcist too.
 Jung Yong-hwa as Oh In-beom, a fraud who makes money using ghosts, but who turns out be a psychic when he gets involved during an exorcism performed by Hong Ji-ah. He partners with Hong Ji-ah for money but later learns the secret about his childhood. His uncle was the last client of Hong Ji-ah's mother.

Supporting
 Ahn Gil-kang as Do Hak-seong
 Chairman of Dohak Construction. A gangster in suit. He gets what he wants no matter what. Responsible for Oh In-bum's uncle's death.
 Kang Hong-seok as Chief Heo, Oh In-bum's friend and partner in crime. A hacker and con artist.
 Kang Mal-geum as Deputy director Joo Manager of Daebak real estate. She has a mysterious past.
 Heo Dong-won as Kim Tae-jin
 Boss of a nightclub, a former gangster
 Baek Eun-hye as Hong Mi-jin, Hong Ji-ah's mother. An exorcist, she died during her last exorcism.
 Baek Hyun-joo as Chang Hwa-mo, she runs 'Changhwa Restaurant' across Daebak Real Estate who is waiting for her son's return to her restaurant after he left her years ago.
 Choi Woo-sung as ‘Hyung-shik’
 Physical student and a spirit medium  who exorcize evil spirits
 Im Ji-kyu as Kim Byeong-ho, a ghost artist of painter Jo Hyun-seo
 Kim Mi-kyung as Yeom sajang, (special appearance) owner of Blue Salt who supplies exorcism equipment to Daebak Realty and close to Hong Ji-ah and her family.
 Baek Ji-won as Lee Eun-Hye, the director of Britium Art
 Kim Dae-gon as Oh Seong-sik, kind uncle to Oh In-beom ghost.
 Kim Sung-bum as police officer Kang Han-seok.
 Lee Chae-kyung as assistant Choi

Special appearance
 Seo Sang-won as Yang Woo-Jin's father (ep. 1)
 Park Han-sol as young Joo Hwa-jung
 Kwon Dong-ho as Hwang Jae-woo [Green Villas] (ep. 5)

Production
On 21 September 2020, it was reported that Jang Na-ra and Jung Yong-hwa have received proposal to pair in an occult drama and they are considering it positively. In November 2020, the drama production company Monster Union confirmed the drama Daebak Real Estate for first half of 2021. On 12 February 2021, it was reported that Jang Na-ra and Jung Yong-hwa were preparing for the drama. Kang Hong-seok and Baek Eun-hye had previously worked together in the tvN Wednesday and Thursday drama What's Wrong with Secretary Kim (2018). Ahn Gil-kang and Baek Ji-won had previously worked together in the KBS2 weekend drama Once Again (2020).

Original soundtrack

Part 1

Part 2

Part 3

Part 4

Part 5

Part 6

Part 7

Part 8

Part 9

Part 10

Viewership

Awards and nominations
Execellent Award (Special Mention)

Notes

References

External links
  
 
 
 
 Sell Your Haunted House at Daum 
 Sell Your Haunted House at Naver 

2021 South Korean television series debuts
Korean-language television shows
South Korean comedy-drama television series
Korean Broadcasting System television dramas
Television series by Monster Union
2021 South Korean television series endings